Darul Uloom Deoband is a major Islamic seminary in India. It was established by Fazlur Rahman Usmani, Muhammad Qasim Nanautawi, Sayyid Muhammad Abid and few other scholars in the town of Deoband. Its well known alumni include Mahmud Hasan Deobandi, the founder of Jamia Millia Islamia, and Shabbir Ahmad Usmani, one of the founding figures of Pakistan. The following is a list of its alumni.

Alumni

References

Citations

Sources

 
 
 

Darul Uloom Deoband
Darul Uloom Deoband alumni